Lamachaera is a genus of moths in the family Cosmopterigidae. It contains only one species, Lamachaera cyanacma, which is found in the Philippines.

References

Antequerinae
Monotypic moth genera
Moths described in 1915
Moths of Asia